Petr Leška (born November 16, 1975) is a Czech professional ice hockey player. He played with HC Zlín in the Czech Extraliga during the 2010–11 Czech Extraliga season.

Career statistics

References

External links 
 
 

1975 births
Czech ice hockey forwards
PSG Berani Zlín players
Living people
Sportspeople from Chomutov
Södertälje SK players
Rögle BK players
Flint Generals (CoHL) players
HC Plzeň players
HC Sparta Praha players
Langley Thunder players
Surrey Eagles players
Czech expatriate ice hockey players in Canada
Czech expatriate ice hockey players in the United States
Czech expatriate ice hockey players in Sweden